Cristoforo Coriolano (born 1540) was a German engraver− of the Renaissance.

Biography 
He was born in Nuremberg. He moved to Italy and changed his name from Lederer for that of Coriolano. He engraved on wood. In the Life of Marcantonio Raimondi, the biographer Vasari assured that his Maestro Cristofano, after achieving some success in Venice, engraved on wood the portraits of the painters, sculptors, and architects, after Vasari's designs, for his Lives of the Painters, first published in 1568. Others consider them to be the work of Christopher Krieger. He also engraved the greater part of the figures in the Ornithology of Ulisse Aldrovandi. He died in Venice in the beginning of the 17th century. His sons Giovanni Battista Coriolano and Bartolommeo Coriolano became eminent engravers in the Baroque period.

References

 Manfred H. Grieb: , Munich 2007
 Thomas, Joseph. Universal Pronouncing Dictionary of Biography and Mythology Vol I. Philadelphia: J. B. Lippincott, 1915.

Italian engravers
Renaissance painters
Painters from Bologna
1540 births
17th-century deaths
Artists from Nuremberg
Catholic engravers